The Apache Elementary School District is a school district with a single one-room school, Apache Elementary School (AES), in rural Cochise County, Arizona.

In 1910 the school was established. The current building opened circa 1969. Sometime prior to 2019 the Cochise County School Superintendent considered having the school district closed, but changed her mind upon seeing the operation of the school. In 2019 the number of students was 10, and there was an employee who served as principal, superintendent, and teacher.

See also
 Non-high school district

References

External links

School districts in Cochise County, Arizona
Public K–8 schools in Arizona
One-room schoolhouses in Arizona
1910 establishments in Arizona Territory
School districts established in 1910